Joe Scarpellino (born in 1994) is an actor from Quebec.

Background
Scarpellino grew up in Saint-Jean-sur-Richelieu. His dad is from Connecticut, while his mom is Québécoise.

Career
After 4 years studying drama arts at La Bulle college, he got his first role on TV in the Ici Radio-Canada Télé show Les Parent.

In 2011 and 2012, he was selected person of the year by the TV show KARV, l'anti.gala.

In 2022 he had his first major leading role in a feature film, as Carter in Renuka Jeyapalan's romantic drama film Stay the Night.

See also 
 Canadian television

References

External links 

Male actors from Quebec
1994 births
Living people
Canadian male television actors
21st-century Canadian male actors
French Quebecers
People from Saint-Jean-sur-Richelieu